Dr. K. Madhukar Shetty  (1971-2018) was an Indian Police Service officer of 1999 batch of Karnataka Cadre. He is remembered for working against illegal mining  in Karnataka.

Early life
Shetty was the son of Kannada journalist Vaddarse Raghurama Shetty.
 Born on 17 December 1971, Madhukar completed his MA in Sociology from Jawaharlal Nehru University, Delhi. He earned his PhD in Public Administration from Rockefeller College of Public Affairs & Policy, University at Albany, New York.

Police service
Shetty worked as ASP Bengaluru Rural district and later as SP of Chamarajanagar and Chikkamagaluru.

Shetty was an integral part of the team that exposed illegal iron ore mining in Ballari, the backyard of powerful mining baron Janardhan Reddy.

In 2006, when a group of 32 families was evicted from the Tatkola forest, allegedly on the orders of government officials, Shetty came up with the idea of allocating 64 acres of the land reclaimed from encroachers, on the edge of the Sargod Kundur reserve forest, to the families.

Death
Shetty was under treatment in Continental Hospitals, Hyderabad where he was being treated for Swine flu, and died on 28 December 2018 due to serious cardiac complications & still suspicious. The Karnataka state government instituted an inquiry to look into the death of Dr Shetty following suspicion from his friend and family that he didn't get adequate medical treatment.

References

1971 births
Kannada people
People from Udupi district
Karnataka Police
2018 deaths
Tulu people
Indian Police Service officers